Raúl Torres Claverías (born 26 October 1977) is a Spanish footballer who plays for CD Varea. Mainly a central defender, he can also play as a full back in either side.

External links 
 
 Futbolme profile  
 

1977 births
Living people
Footballers from Madrid
Spanish footballers
Association football defenders
Segunda División players
Segunda División B players
Tercera División players
Atlético Madrid B players
Real Murcia players
Jerez Industrial CF players
Polideportivo Ejido footballers
UD Logroñés players